Jayanta Sagatpam Singh (born 12 October 1992) is an Indian cricketer. He made his List A debut for Manipur in the 2018–19 Vijay Hazare Trophy on 20 September 2018. He made his first-class debut for Manipur in the 2018–19 Ranji Trophy on 1 November 2018. He made his Twenty20 debut on 11 November 2019, for Manipur in the 2019–20 Syed Mushtaq Ali Trophy.

References

External links
 

1992 births
Living people
Indian cricketers
Manipur cricketers
Place of birth missing (living people)